Al-Sibaiyah Madrasa or Jami al-Jawami is a 16th-century  madrasah complex in Damascus, Syria.

See also
 Al-Adiliyah Madrasa
 Al-Rukniyah Madrasa
 Az-Zahiriyah Library
 Nur al-Din Madrasa

References

Mausoleums in Syria
Buildings and structures completed in 1515
Buildings and structures inside the walled city of Damascus
Madrasas in Damascus
1510s in Ottoman Syria
16th-century establishments in Ottoman Syria